Hyalaethea obraztsovi is a moth of the subfamily Arctiinae first described by Rob de Vos in 2010. It is found on New Guinea.

References

Arctiinae
Moths described in 2010